The 1993–94 NBA season was the Jazz's 20th season in the National Basketball Association, and 15th season in Salt Lake City, Utah. During the off-season, the Jazz signed free agent All-Star forward Tom Chambers, and acquired Felton Spencer from the Minnesota Timberwolves. The Jazz played competitive basketball with a 22–8 start, but then lost five of their next six games, and held a 31–18 record at the All-Star break. At midseason, the team traded Jeff Malone to the Philadelphia 76ers in exchange for Jeff Hornacek. With the addition of Hornacek, the Jazz posted a ten-game winning streak between February and March, and won nine of their final eleven games finishing third in the Midwest Division with a 53–29 record. They made their eleventh consecutive trip to the playoffs.

John Stockton led the league in assists for the seventh straight season, as Karl Malone joined the list in all-time points scored topping the 19,000 point mark. Stockton averaged 15.1 points, 12.6 assists and 2.4 steals per game, while Malone averaged 25.2 points, 11.5 rebounds and 1.5 blocks per game, Chambers provided the team with 11.2 points per game off the bench, and Spencer contributed 8.6 points and 8.3 rebounds per game. Both Stockton and Malone were named to the All-NBA First Team, and selected for the 1994 NBA All-Star Game. Malone also finished tied in seventh place in Most Valuable Player voting.

In the Western Conference First Round of the playoffs, the Jazz lost Game 1 to the 4th-seeded San Antonio Spurs on the road, 106–89, but managed to win the next three games, thus the series. In the Western Conference Semi-finals, they took a 3–0 series lead over the 8th-seeded Denver Nuggets. However, the Jazz would lose the next three games to the Nuggets, then finally win Game 7 and advance to the next round. In the Western Conference Finals, they lost in five games to the Houston Rockets. The Rockets would go on to defeat the New York Knicks in seven games in the NBA Finals, winning their first ever championship.

Following the season, Tyrone Corbin was traded to the Atlanta Hawks, and Mark Eaton retired after missing the entire season with a back injury.

Draft picks

Roster

Roster Notes
 Center Mark Eaton missed the entire season due to a back injury.
 Rookie center Luther Wright was placed on the injured reverse list for treatment of attention deficit disorder after playing 15 games.

Regular season

Season standings

z – clinched division title
y – clinched division title
x – clinched playoff spot

Record vs. opponents

Game log

Regular season

|- align="center" bgcolor="#ccffcc"
| 1
| November 5, 1993
| Dallas
| W 102–86
|
|
|
| Delta Center
| 1–0
|- align="center" bgcolor="#ccffcc"
| 2
| November 6, 1993
| @ Minnesota
| W 105–95
|
|
|
| Target Center
| 2–0
|- align="center" bgcolor="#ffcccc"
| 3
| November 8, 1993
| Seattle
| L 100–101
|
|
|
| Delta Center
| 2–1
|- align="center" bgcolor="#ccffcc"
| 4
| November 10, 1993
| Atlanta
| W 91–88
|
|
|
| Delta Center
| 3–1
|- align="center" bgcolor="#ccffcc"
| 5
| November 12, 1993
| Detroit
| W 109–89
|
|
|
| Delta Center
| 4–1
|- align="center" bgcolor="#ccffcc"
| 6
| November 13, 1993
| @ Dallas
| W 101–100
|
|
|
| Reunion Arena
| 5–1
|- align="center" bgcolor="#ffcccc"
| 7
| November 16, 1993
| @ Orlando
| L 96–114
|
|
|
| Orlando Arena
| 5–2
|- align="center" bgcolor="#ccffcc"
| 8
| November 17, 1993
| @ Miami
| W 115–111
|
|
|
| Miami Arena
| 6–2
|- align="center" bgcolor="#ffcccc"
| 9
| November 19, 1993
| @ Philadelphia
| L 115–124
|
|
|
| The Spectrum
| 6–3
|- align="center" bgcolor="#ccffcc"
| 10
| November 20, 1993
| @ New York
| W 86–72
|
|
|
| Madison Square Garden
| 7–3
|- align="center" bgcolor="#ffcccc"
| 11
| November 24, 1993
| Houston
| L 93–95 (OT)
|
|
|
| Delta Center
| 7–4
|- align="center" bgcolor="#ccffcc"
| 12
| November 26, 1993
| New Jersey
| W 100–97
|
|
|
| Delta Center
| 8–4
|- align="center" bgcolor="#ffcccc"
| 13
| November 27, 1993
| @ Phoenix
| L 98–120
|
|
|
| America West Arena
| 8–5
|- align="center" bgcolor="#ccffcc"
| 14
| November 30, 1993
| Denver
| W 103–92
|
|
|
| Delta Center
| 9–5

|- align="center" bgcolor="#ccffcc"
| 15
| December 2, 1993
| Indiana
| W 103–87
|
|
|
| Delta Center
| 10–5
|- align="center" bgcolor="#ccffcc"
| 16
| December 4, 1993
| Charlotte
| W 122–108
|
|
|
| Delta Center
| 11–5
|- align="center" bgcolor="#ccffcc"
| 17
| December 6, 1993
| New York
| W 103–96
|
|
|
| Delta Center
| 12–5
|- align="center" bgcolor="#ccffcc"
| 18
| December 8, 1993
| Washington
| W 113–91
|
|
|
| Delta Center
| 13–5
|- align="center" bgcolor="#ffcccc"
| 19
| December 10, 1993
| @ Denver
| L 98–107
|
|
|
| McNichols Sports Arena
| 13–6
|- align="center" bgcolor="#ffcccc"
| 20
| December 11, 1993
| @ Golden State
| L 112–115 (OT)
|
|
|
| Oakland-Alameda County Coliseum Arena
| 13–7
|- align="center" bgcolor="#ccffcc"
| 21
| December 13, 1993
| San Antonio
| W 102–87
|
|
|
| Delta Center
| 14–7
|- align="center" bgcolor="#ccffcc"
| 22
| December 15, 1993
| @ Minnesota
| W 97–95
|
|
|
| Target Center
| 15–7
|- align="center" bgcolor="#ccffcc"
| 23
| December 17, 1993
| @ Boston
| W 97–96
|
|
|
| Boston Garden
| 16–7
|- align="center" bgcolor="#ccffcc"
| 24
| December 18, 1993
| @ Washington
| W 102–96
|
|
|
| USAir Arena
| 17–7
|- align="center" bgcolor="#ffcccc"
| 25
| December 21, 1993
| @ Cleveland
| L 97–112
|
|
|
| Richfield Coliseum
| 17–8
|- align="center" bgcolor="#ccffcc"
| 26
| December 23, 1993
| @ San Antonio
| W 96–88
|
|
|
| Alamodome
| 18–8
|- align="center" bgcolor="#ccffcc"
| 27
| December 27, 1993
| Minnesota
| W 97–93
|
|
|
| Delta Center
| 19–8
|- align="center" bgcolor="#ccffcc"
| 28
| December 29, 1993
| Boston
| W 110–107 (OT)
|
|
|
| Delta Center
| 20–8

|- align="center" bgcolor="#ccffcc"
| 29
| January 2, 1994
| @ Portland
| W 92–90
|
|
|
| Memorial Coliseum
| 21–8
|- align="center" bgcolor="#ccffcc"
| 30
| January 3, 1994
| Dallas
| W 115–85
|
|
|
| Delta Center
| 22–8
|- align="center" bgcolor="#ffcccc"
| 31
| January 5, 1994
| Phoenix
| L 91–107
|
|
|
| Delta Center
| 22–9
|- align="center" bgcolor="#ffcccc"
| 32
| January 7, 1994
| Miami
| L 104–110
|
|
|
| Delta Center
| 22–10
|- align="center" bgcolor="#ffcccc"
| 33
| January 8, 1994
| @ Seattle
| L 87–108
|
|
|
| Seattle Center Coliseum
| 22–11
|- align="center" bgcolor="#ccffcc"
| 34
| January 13, 1994
| @ Milwaukee
| W 101–83
|
|
|
| Bradley Center
| 23–11
|- align="center" bgcolor="#ffcccc"
| 35
| January 14, 1994
| @ Chicago
| L 91–107
|
|
|
| Chicago Stadium
| 23–12
|- align="center" bgcolor="#ffcccc"
| 36
| January 16, 1994
| @ New Jersey
| L 94–99
|
|
|
| Brendan Byrne Arena
| 23–13
|- align="center" bgcolor="#ccffcc"
| 37
| January 17, 1994
| @ Detroit
| W 109–94
|
|
|
| The Palace of Auburn Hills
| 24–13
|- align="center" bgcolor="#ccffcc"
| 38
| January 19, 1994
| Cleveland
| W 104–92
|
|
|
| Delta Center
| 25–13
|- align="center" bgcolor="#ccffcc"
| 39
| January 21, 1994
| Sacramento
| W 112–83
|
|
|
| Delta Center
| 26–13
|- align="center" bgcolor="#ffcccc"
| 40
| January 22, 1994
| @ Houston
| L 101–106
|
|
|
| The Summit
| 26–14
|- align="center" bgcolor="#ccffcc"
| 41
| January 24, 1994
| Seattle
| W 95–90
|
|
|
| Delta Center
| 27–14
|- align="center" bgcolor="#ffcccc"
| 42
| January 26, 1994
| @ Minnesota
| L 98–100
|
|
|
| Target Center
| 27–15
|- align="center" bgcolor="#ccffcc"
| 43
| January 28, 1994
| Golden State
| W 119–91
|
|
|
| Delta Center
| 28–15

|- align="center" bgcolor="#ccffcc"
| 44
| February 1, 1994
| Houston
| W 104–88
|
|
|
| Delta Center
| 29–15
|- align="center" bgcolor="#ffcccc"
| 45
| February 3, 1994
| Chicago
| L 85–94
|
|
|
| Delta Center
| 29–16
|- align="center" bgcolor="#ccffcc"
| 46
| February 5, 1994
| Portland
| W 128–114
|
|
|
| Delta Center
| 30–16
|- align="center" bgcolor="#ffcccc"
| 47
| February 6, 1994
| @ L.A. Lakers
| L 90–107
|
|
|
| Great Western Forum
| 30–17
|- align="center" bgcolor="#ccffcc"
| 48
| February 8, 1994
| @ Denver
| W 96–95
|
|
|
| McNichols Sports Arena
| 31–17
|- align="center" bgcolor="#ffcccc"
| 49
| February 9, 1994
| L.A. Lakers
| L 96–103
|
|
|
| Delta Center
| 31–18
|- align="center"
|colspan="9" bgcolor="#bbcaff"|All-Star Break
|- style="background:#cfc;"
|- bgcolor="#bbffbb"
|- align="center" bgcolor="#ccffcc"
| 50
| February 16, 1994
| @ L.A. Clippers
| W 103–99
|
|
|
| Los Angeles Memorial Sports Arena
| 32–18
|- align="center" bgcolor="#ffcccc"
| 51
| February 18, 1994
| @ Sacramento
| L 81–90
|
|
|
| ARCO Arena
| 32–19
|- align="center" bgcolor="#ccffcc"
| 52
| February 19, 1994
| L.A. Clippers
| W 100–93
|
|
|
| Delta Center
| 33–19
|- align="center" bgcolor="#ccffcc"
| 53
| February 21, 1994
| Philadelphia
| W 119–92
|
|
|
| Delta Center
| 34–19
|- align="center" bgcolor="#ccffcc"
| 54
| February 23, 1994
| San Antonio
| W 106–102 (2OT)
|
|
|
| Delta Center
| 35–19
|- align="center" bgcolor="#ccffcc"
| 55
| February 25, 1994
| Phoenix
| W 107–87
|
|
|
| Delta Center
| 36–19
|- align="center" bgcolor="#ccffcc"
| 56
| February 26, 1994
| @ Houston
| W 95–85
|
|
|
| The Summit
| 37–19
|- align="center" bgcolor="#ccffcc"
| 57
| February 28, 1994
| Houston
| W 89–85
|
|
|
| Delta Center
| 38–19

|- align="center" bgcolor="#ccffcc"
| 58
| March 2, 1994
| @ San Antonio
| W 106–96
|
|
|
| Alamodome
| 39–19
|- align="center" bgcolor="#ccffcc"
| 59
| March 5, 1994
| @ Dallas
| W 103–90
|
|
|
| Reunion Arena
| 40–19
|- align="center" bgcolor="#ccffcc"
| 60
| March 6, 1994
| @ Phoenix
| W 103–92
|
|
|
| America West Arena
| 41–19
|- align="center" bgcolor="#ccffcc"
| 61
| March 8, 1994
| Minnesota
| W 100–86
|
|
|
| Delta Center
| 42–19
|- align="center" bgcolor="#ffcccc"
| 62
| March 9, 1994
| @ Portland
| L 99–122
|
|
|
| Memorial Coliseum
| 42–20
|- align="center" bgcolor="#ccffcc"
| 63
| March 14, 1994
| L.A. Lakers
| W 102–101
|
|
|
| Delta Center
| 43–20
|- align="center" bgcolor="#ffcccc"
| 64
| March 15, 1994
| @ L.A. Clippers
| L 105–108
|
|
|
| Los Angeles Memorial Sports Arena
| 43–21
|- align="center" bgcolor="#ffcccc"
| 65
| March 18, 1994
| @ Charlotte
| L 78–82
|
|
|
| Charlotte Coliseum
| 43–22
|- align="center" bgcolor="#ffcccc"
| 66
| March 19, 1994
| @ Indiana
| L 103–107
|
|
|
| Market Square Arena
| 43–23
|- align="center" bgcolor="#ffcccc"
| 67
| March 21, 1994
| @ Atlanta
| L 96–100 (OT)
|
|
|
| The Omni
| 43–24
|- align="center" bgcolor="#ffcccc"
| 68
| March 23, 1994
| Orlando
| L 93–98
|
|
|
| Delta Center
| 43–25
|- align="center" bgcolor="#ccffcc"
| 69
| March 25, 1994
| Milwaukee
| W 103–96
|
|
|
| Delta Center
| 44–25
|- align="center" bgcolor="#ffcccc"
| 70
| March 26, 1994
| @ Houston
| L 83–98
|
|
|
| The Summit
| 44–26
|- align="center" bgcolor="#ffcccc"
| 71
| March 29, 1994
| Golden State
| L 113–116
|
|
|
| Delta Center
| 44–27

|- align="center" bgcolor="#ccffcc"
| 72
| April 2, 1994
| Denver
| W 101–91
|
|
|
| Delta Center
| 45–27
|- align="center" bgcolor="#ffcccc"
| 73
| April 5, 1994
| @ Seattle
| L 79–86
|
|
|
| Seattle Center Coliseum
| 45–28
|- align="center" bgcolor="#ccffcc"
| 74
| April 7, 1994
| Dallas
| W 99–82
|
|
|
| Delta Center
| 46–28
|- align="center" bgcolor="#ccffcc"
| 75
| April 9, 1994
| L.A. Clippers
| W 128–104
|
|
|
| Delta Center
| 47–28
|- align="center" bgcolor="#ccffcc"
| 76
| April 12, 1994
| Sacramento
| W 126–91
|
|
|
| Delta Center
| 48–28
|- align="center" bgcolor="#ccffcc"
| 77
| April 14, 1994
| San Antonio
| W 101–90
|
|
|
| Delta Center
| 49–28
|- align="center" bgcolor="#ffcccc"
| 78
| April 16, 1994
| @ Golden State
| L 105–109
|
|
|
| Oakland-Alameda County Coliseum Arena
| 49–29
|- align="center" bgcolor="#ccffcc"
| 79
| April 19, 1994
| @ Sacramento
| W 115–108
|
|
|
| ARCO Arena
| 50–29
|- align="center" bgcolor="#ccffcc"
| 80
| April 21, 1994
| Portland
| W 122–111
|
|
|
| Delta Center
| 51–29
|- align="center" bgcolor="#ccffcc"
| 81
| April 22, 1994
| @ Denver
| W 113–106
|
|
|
| McNichols Sports Arena
| 52–29
|- align="center" bgcolor="#ccffcc"
| 82
| April 24, 1994
| @ L.A. Lakers
| W 103–97
|
|
|
| Great Western Forum
| 53–29

Playoffs

|- align="center" bgcolor="#ffcccc"
| 1
| April 28, 1994
| @ San Antonio
| L 89–106
| Karl Malone (36)
| Karl Malone (10)
| John Stockton (8)
| Alamodome18,257
| 0–1
|- align="center" bgcolor="#ccffcc"
| 2
| April 30, 1994
| @ San Antonio
| W 96–84
| Karl Malone (23)
| Karl Malone (14)
| John Stockton (5)
| Alamodome20,640
| 1–1
|- align="center" bgcolor="#ccffcc"
| 3
| May 3, 1994
| San Antonio
| W 105–72
| Karl Malone (24)
| Karl Malone (13)
| John Stockton (12)
| Delta Center19,911
| 2–1
|- align="center" bgcolor="#ccffcc"
| 4
| May 5, 1994
| San Antonio
| W 95–90
| Karl Malone (34)
| Karl Malone (12)
| John Stockton (18)
| Delta Center19,911
| 3–1
|-

|- align="center" bgcolor="#ccffcc"
| 1
| May 10, 1994
| Denver
| W 100–91
| Karl Malone (25)
| Karl Malone (10)
| John Stockton (11)
| Delta Center19,911
| 1–0
|- align="center" bgcolor="#ccffcc"
| 2
| May 12, 1994
| Denver
| W 104–94
| Karl Malone (32)
| Karl Malone (12)
| John Stockton (8)
| Delta Center19,911
| 2–0
|- align="center" bgcolor="#ccffcc"
| 3
| May 14, 1994
| @ Denver
| W 111–109 (OT)
| Jeff Hornacek (27)
| Karl Malone (13)
| John Stockton (13)
| McNichols Sports Arena17,171
| 3–0
|- align="center" bgcolor="#ffcccc"
| 4
| May 15, 1994
| @ Denver
| L 82–83
| Karl Malone (20)
| Karl Malone (9)
| John Stockton (6)
| McNichols Sports Arena17,171
| 3–1
|- align="center" bgcolor="#ffcccc"
| 5
| May 17, 1994
| Denver
| L 101–109 (2OT)
| Karl Malone (22)
| Corbin, Spencer (14)
| John Stockton (13)
| Delta Center19,911
| 3–2
|- align="center" bgcolor="#ffcccc"
| 6
| May 19, 1994
| @ Denver
| L 91–94
| Karl Malone (31)
| Karl Malone (15)
| John Stockton (7)
| McNichols Sports Arena17,171
| 3–3
|- align="center" bgcolor="#ccffcc"
| 7
| May 21, 1994
| Denver
| W 91–81
| Karl Malone (31)
| Karl Malone (14)
| John Stockton (9)
| Delta Center19,911
| 4–3
|-

|- align="center" bgcolor="#ffcccc"
| 1
| May 23, 1994
| @ Houston
| L 86–100
| Karl Malone (20)
| Karl Malone (16)
| John Stockton (11)
| The Summit16,611
| 0–1
|- align="center" bgcolor="#ffcccc"
| 2
| May 25, 1994
| @ Houston
| L 99–104
| Karl Malone (32)
| Malone, Spencer (7)
| John Stockton (10)
| The Summit16,611
| 0–2
|- align="center" bgcolor="#ccffcc"
| 3
| May 27, 1994
| Houston
| W 95–86
| Karl Malone (22)
| Karl Malone (16)
| John Stockton (11)
| Delta Center19,911
| 1–2
|- align="center" bgcolor="#ffcccc"
| 4
| May 29, 1994
| Houston
| L 78–80
| Karl Malone (25)
| Karl Malone (14)
| John Stockton (6)
| Delta Center19,911
| 1–3
|- align="center" bgcolor="#ffcccc"
| 5
| May 31, 1994
| @ Houston
| L 83–94
| Karl Malone (31)
| Felton Spencer (15)
| John Stockton (9)
| The Summit16,611
| 1–4
|-

Player statistics

Season

Playoffs

Player Statistics Citation:

Awards and records

Awards
 Karl Malone, All-NBA First Team
 John Stockton, All-NBA First Team

Records

Transactions

Trades

Free agents

Additions

Subtractions

See also
 1993–94 NBA season

References

Utah Jazz seasons
Utah
Utah
Utah